Keith Rooney (born 13 February 1981) is an Irish professional darts player who has played in Professional Darts Corporation events.

Known as Titanium, Rooney qualified for the 2005 World Grand Prix, where he defeated James Wade in the first round, before losing to Dennis Priestley in the second round.

He qualified for the 2013 UK Masters on the PDC European Tour, but lost his first round match to Andy Smith of England.

He would win an Ireland Players Championship event in 2010, as well as the Northern Ireland Open in 2016.

He Runner-up an Ireland Darts Masters in 2019 he lost to Lewy Williams for Wales 3–6 (legs).

References

External links

Irish darts players
1981 births
Living people
British Darts Organisation players
Professional Darts Corporation associate players